This is a list of members of the Victorian Legislative Assembly from 1945 to 1947, as elected at the 1945 state election:

 On 25 April 1947, the Country member for Benambra, Roy Paton, died. Country candidate Tom Mitchell won the resulting by-election on 7 June 1947.
 In August 1947, the Labor member for Collingwood, Tom Tunnecliffe, resigned. Labor candidate Bill Towers won the resulting by-election on 20 September 1947.

Sources
 Re-member (a database of all Victorian MPs since 1851). Parliament of Victoria.

Members of the Parliament of Victoria by term
20th-century Australian politicians